The Ministry of Labour is the national executive ministry of Colombia in charge of formulating, implementing, and orienting labour policy and labour relations to stimulate job growth through job creation programs. It is also in charge of labour rights, pensions, and occupational safety and health in Colombia.

References

 
Colombia, Labour